Travancore Medical College Hospital or Travancore Medicity Medical College is a private medical college situated in the city of Kollam, Kerala, india. Medicity was established in 2008, which is managed and run by Quilon Medical Trust.

Travancore Medical College is an ISO 9001:2008 certified Medical College and is affiliated to Kerala University of Health Sciences, permitted by Medical Council of India (MCI) to offer education in medicine and nursing at the undergraduate level. Travancore Medical College Hospital spread over 98 acres of land.
 General Medicine
 General Surgery
 Obstetrics and Gynaecology
 Emergency Medicine
 Radio diagnosis
 Dermatology and Cosmetics
 Otorhinolaryngology
 Ophthalmology
 Cardiology
 Psychiatry
 Cardiothoracic Surgery
 Neurology
 Neurosurgery
 Urology
 Nephrology
 Gastroenterology
 Endocrinology
 Orthopedics and Sports Medicine
 Paediatrics
 Neonatology
 Pulmonology
 Critical Care

Medical colleges in Kollam
Hospitals in Kollam
Colleges affiliated with the Kerala University of Health Sciences
Private medical colleges in India
2008 establishments in Kerala
Educational institutions established in 2008